Patrick Van Veirdeghem (Lokeren, 19 January 1963) is a former Belgian footballer who played as central midfielder.

Honours 
Royal Antwerp

 Belgian Cup: 1991-92
 UEFA Cup Winners' Cup: 1992-93 (runners-up)

References

External links
 

Living people
1963 births
Belgian footballers
Association football midfielders
K.S.C. Lokeren Oost-Vlaanderen players
Royal Antwerp F.C. players
K.V. Oostende players
Belgian Pro League players
People from Lokeren
Footballers from East Flanders